Grant Foster (born 1945) is an Australian composer, pianist, teacher and novelist.  He was the co-founder and inaugural Artistic Director of the Southern Highlands International Piano Competition.  His musical is lyrical and romantic, and he is well-known in Russia, despite being relatively unknown in his own country.

Grant Foster was born in Sydney in 1945 and studied at the Sydney Conservatorium of Music under Alexander Sverjensky, then in Paris under Marcel Ciampi, to whom he was recommended by Yehudi Menuhin after hearing him play, and under Denise Rivière.  In 1966 Foster won the State ABC Concerto Competition with his performance of the Piano Concerto in D-flat by Aram Khachaturian.

The musical Peter Pan, directed by Sir Robert Helpmann, with music by Foster, ran in London for seven consecutive Christmas seasons.  After 20 years in Europe, he returned to Australia in 1985. In 2007 he co-founded the Southern Highlands International Piano Competition, which is held every two years.  He was its Artistic Director until 2013, when he was succeeded by Gerard Willems.

He is better known in Russia than in Australia.  His works have been recorded by the Novaya Rossiya State Symphony Orchestra, by the Serbian-born pianist Mira Yevtich, among others.

Foster has also written eight novels, six of them for children.    He resides in Bowral, New South Wales.

Selected works

Awards and nominations

ARIA Music Awards
The ARIA Music Awards is an annual awards ceremony that recognises excellence, innovation, and achievement across all genres of Australian music. They commenced in 1987. 

! 
|-
| 1987
| Rhapsody for Piano and Orchestra
| Best Classical Album
| 
|rowspan="1" | 
|-

Notes

Living people
1945 births
Australian composers
Australian classical pianists
Male classical pianists
Australian male novelists
21st-century classical pianists
21st-century Australian male musicians
21st-century Australian musicians